Jango is an American free online music streaming service available worldwide.

History
Based in New York City, Jango was launched in November 2007 by Daniel Kaufman, Chris Dowhan, and Giancarlo Delmo who were previously the founders of Dash.com.

At the time of 2009-2010, Jango only had 200,000 tracks from around 15,000 artists in its library. As of November 2014, Jango's library size is 15 times bigger, topping 30 million songs. As of February 2016, Jango had 8 million active users.

Jango's business model is derived from advertising revenues and transaction fees from selling music through the site.  There are currently no premium services available for the site.

Features
Stating that its uninterrupted playlists are handmade by music experts and many of them are updated weekly, the service will recommend its users on various playlists mainly based on mood or activity. Jango offers playlists for activities such as waking up, working out, commuting, concentrating, unwinding, entertaining, and sleeping. Unlike Songza, there are no other filters (activity, decades, mood) to narrow the searched results down except the genre-based ones. Users are able to skip unlimited times, like and ban a predetermined number of songs, alongside adjusting the variety, and add up to six artists onto the playlist. The service will adapt to the user's personal music preferences based on all of these settings. Users would find playlists not just based on artists or genres, but also based on themes, interests, and eras, such as "Featured in Apple Commercials", or "Misheard Lyrics".

In addition, users are also able to create their own playlists themselves based on their favourite artists.

The service can be accessed either through a web browser or with its mobile app on a smartphone.

In 2007, Jango became the first music streaming platform to introduce a social networking aspect to radio stations. Users can share their playlists or listen to playlists created by others in the Jango social network.

The site also provides independent artists the opportunity, for a fee, to showcase their music by recommending their songs alongside that of similar popular artists. This feature is called Jango Airplay, band and solo artists alike can buy 1,000 plays for as little as $30. There are three rules related to this feature:
 Airplay song can only be played once within any two-hour period.
 An Airplay song, once played, will not play again throughout that entire day.
 Any song receiving 50 upvotes from the listeners will get pushed into the regular playlist rotation at no extra cost.

See also
 List of online music databases
 List of social networking websites
 List of Internet radio stations

References

External links
 

Music streaming services
Internet properties established in 2007
2007 establishments in New York (state)